The 44M Lidérc (Hungarian: succubus) was an experimental air-to-air rocket developed in Hungary during World War II. It had an acoustic proximity fuse invented by Károly Pulváry (Technological University of Budapest). The acoustic device was a highly advanced technology in 1944 and the research of necessary electronics was quite a complex project. The sensor consisted of a super-sensitive microphone, and a squelch principle circuit with two electron tube amplifiers.

Cutaway plan of the Lidérc: (tortenelem.444.hu)

The fuse worked excellently with the artificial American bomber-engine sound in the Aerotechnical Institute's wind tunnel. During air combat every Me 210 Ca-1 destroyer-aircraft (Hungarian: romboló, German: zerstörer) would have launched 2-4 Lidérc into a bomber group which was expected to cause great damage and significantly impact the morale of bomber crews. The main goal was to disarrange bombing sorties rather than destroy airplanes in order to protect civilians from terror-bombings.

A total of a few hundred rockets were produced, but the bombing raids made it impossible to finish the acoustic system. The weapon was produced in Csepel at Weiss Manfred Works, but due to the bomb attacks on the factory, DIMÁVAG continued it. The Hungarian troops used them in the defensive operations of Csepel Island, Érd, and later in Lake Velence as anti-personnel incendiary artillery rocket (like Nebelwerfer) against Soviet human-wave attacks.

References

Air-to-air rockets